Arick Village, Texas is the unofficial name of a portion of the Terlingua Ranch unincorporated community located in Brewster County, Texas. Arick Village is located East of Highway 118, and West of 9-Point Mesa (outside of Terlingua, TX). Big Bend National Park and Big Bend Ranch State Park are located near by.

References

Unincorporated communities in Texas
Census-designated places in Texas
Geography of Brewster County, Texas